Permanent Sleep is the debut studio album by Scottish post-punk band Lowlife. It was released in 1986 in Scotland by the independent music record label Nightshift Records.

Background 
Permanent Sleep was recorded at Palladium Studios in Edinburgh, Scotland during June–July 1986.

Track listing

Reissue 
The 2006 reissue by LTM Recordings was augmented by seven bonus tracks: the six-song EP Rain (1985) and a slightly different version of the track "From Side to Side", taken from the band's 1987 Diminuendo album.

Personnel 
 Lowlife

 Craig Lorentson – vocals, production
 Stuart Everest – guitar, production
 Will Heggie – bass guitar, production
 Grant McDowall – drums, production

 Technical

 Keith Mitchell – production

References

External links 

 
 Trouser Press summary of Permanent Sleep

Lowlife (band) albums
1986 debut albums